Megacodon is a genus of flowering plants belonging to the family Gentianaceae.

Its native range is the Central Himalayas to Southern Central China.

Species
Species:

Megacodon stylophorus 
Megacodon venosus

References

Gentianaceae
Gentianaceae genera